Beaumont-du-Périgord (literally Beaumont of the Périgord) is a former commune in the Dordogne department in Nouvelle-Aquitaine in southwestern France, on 1 January 2016, it was merged into the new commune Beaumontois-en-Périgord.

Population

See also
Communes of the Dordogne department

References

Former communes of Dordogne
Dordogne communes articles needing translation from French Wikipedia